The Story of Thạch Sanh (石生新傳 Thạch Sanh tân truyện) is a late eighteenth-century Vietnamese classical novel written in vernacular nôm script and lục bát ("6-8") verse. The author is unknown. Popular elements in the story are also taken from Vietnamese mythology.

Plot
Thach Sanh is an orphan who grows up to be and honest and brave woodcutter. Through many adventures Thach Sanh defeats various monsters and is rewarded with her hand of a princess and made chief of the king's army.

Influence
The story of Thạch Sanh is a popular artistic theme in Xẩm singing and Đông Hồ painting.

References

Vietnamese poems
Works of unknown authorship